The 2012–13 Meistriliiga season was the 23rd season of the Meistriliiga, the top level of ice hockey in Estonia. Five teams participated in the league, and Tallinn Viiking Sport won the championship.

Regular season

Playoffs

Semifinals
 Tallinn Viiking Sport – Tallinn HC Panter Purikad 3:0 (15:3, 7:1, 5:3)
 Narva PSK – Tartu Kalev-Välk 1:3 (3:8, 3:7, 5:4, 3:9)

3rd place game
 Narva PSK – Tallinn HC Panter Purikad 7:4

Final
 Tallinn Viiking Sport – Tartu Kalev-Välk 3:1 (3:2, 0:2, 4:3, 4:3)

External links
 Estonian Ice Hockey Federation

Est
Meistriliiga
Meistriliiga (ice hockey) seasons